Patrick Levels (born July 13, 1994) is a Canadian football defensive back for the Ottawa Redblacks of the Canadian Football League (CFL).

Professional career

Calgary Stampeders
Levels played for the Calgary Stampeders from 2017 to 2018 and won his first Grey Cup championship following the Stampeders' victory in the 106th Grey Cup game.

Montreal Alouettes
After signing as a free agent with the Montreal Alouettes, Levels played in all 18 games where he had 86 defensive tackles, five sacks, and two forced fumbles and was named a CFL East All-Star at year's end.

Hamilton Tiger-Cats
On February 12, 2020, Levels signed with the Hamilton Tiger-Cats. However, the 2020 CFL season was cancelled and he did not play for the team.

Montreal Alouettes (II)
Levels re-signed with the Montreal Alouettes on February 9, 2021. In 12 games, he recorded 42 defensive tackles, three sacks, one interception, and one touchdown. He became a free agent upon the expiry of his contract on February 8, 2022.

Ottawa Redblacks
On February 9, 2022, it was announced that Levels had signed with the Ottawa Redblacks.

References

External links
Ottawa Redblacks bio

1994 births
Living people
Hamilton Tiger-Cats players
American football defensive backs
Canadian football defensive backs
Baylor Bears football players
Calgary Stampeders players
Montreal Alouettes players
Ottawa Redblacks players